Matthias is a name derived from the Greek Ματθαίος, in origin similar to Matthew.

People
Notable people named Matthias include the following:

In religion:
 Saint Matthias, chosen as an apostle in Acts 1:21–26 to replace Judas Iscariot
 Matthias of Trakai (–1453), Lithuanian clergyman, bishop of Samogitia and of Vilnius
 Matthias Flacius, Lutheran reformer
 Matthias the Prophet, see Robert Matthews (religious impostor) Claimed to be the reincarnation of the original Matthias during the Second Great Awakening
 Matthias F. Cowley, Latter-day Saint apostle

In the arts:
 Matthias Grünewald, highly regarded painter from the German Renaissance
 Matthías Jochumsson, Icelandic poet
 Matthias Lechner, German film art director
 Matthias Paul (actor), German actor
 Matthias Schoenaerts, Belgian actor

In nobility:
 Matthias Corvinus of Hungary, King of Hungary
 Matthias, Holy Roman Emperor, Emperor of the Holy Roman Empire (Habsburg dynasty)

In music:
 Matthias Bamert (born 1942), Swiss composer
 Matthias Jabs, German guitarist and songwriter
 Matthias Menck, German audio engineer, electronic music producer and DJ
 Matthias Paul (DJ), German Electronic Dance Music DJ, musician and producer known by his stage name Paul van Dyk
 Matthias Weckmann, North German musician and composer of the Baroque period

Other:
 Matthias Abele (1618–1677), jurist
 Matthias Adamczewski (born 1958), German sailor
 Matthias Ahrens (born 1961), German mountain guide
 Matthias Albinus (fl. 1570s), Polish Calvinist minister
 F. Matthias Alexander, Australian actor who developed the educational process that is today called the Alexander Technique
 Matthias Alleyn (died 1642), 17th-century London gentleman and College Master
 Matthias Almer (born 1994), Austrian badminton player
 Matthias Arnold (born 1997), Austrian footballer
 Matthias Aschenbrenner (born 1972), American mathematician 
 Matthias Askew (born 1982), American football player
 Matthias Attwood (born 1779), British politician
 Matthias Aulike (1807-1865), civil servant
 Matthias Bachinger (born 1987), German tennis player
 Matthias Bader (born 1997), German footballer
 Matthias Baranowski (born 1967), German footballer
 Matthias Barr (1831-1911), Scottish poet
 Matthias Bartgis (1759-1825), German-American business person
 Matthias Bartke (born 1959), German politician
 Matthias Baumann (born 1963), Olympic athlete
 Matthias Bieber (born 1986), Swiss ice hockey player
 Matthias Biedermann (born 1983), German skeleton racer
 Matthias Billen (1910-1989), German footballer
 Matthias Birkwald (born 1961), German politician
 Mattias Ekström, Swedish racing driver
 Matthias Ettrich, German computer scientist and founder of KDE and LyX
 Matthias Fekl (born 1977), French politician
 Matthias Felleisen, programming languages researcher
 Matthias Frings, German writer and journalist
 Matthias Ginter, German football player
 Matthias Goossen, Canadian football player
 Matthias Kreck, German mathematician
 Matthias Pfenninger, Swiss artist
 Matthias Platzeck, German politician
 Matthias Sammer, former German football (soccer) player who is now a head coach
 Matthias Jakob Schleiden, a German botanist and co-founder of the cell theory

Fictional characters:
 Matthias, central figure in Brian Jacques's Redwall series
 Matthias Helvar, character in Leigh Bardugo's Six of Crows and Shadow and Bone played by Calohan Skogman

Buildings
 Matthias Church in Budapest

Cognates  
The following forenames are related to the English forename Matthias:

 Afrikaans: Matthys
Amharic: ማትያስ (Mathias)
Assyrian Aramaic/Syriac: ܡܲܬܿܝܵܐ (Mattiya)
 Belarusian: Мацей (Maciej)
 Catalan: Mateu
 Czech: Matyáš, Matěj
 Danish: Mattias, Matthias, Matias, Mads
 Dutch: Matthias, Mathijs, Matthijs
 English: Matthias, Matthew, Matt
 Estonian: Mattias
 Finnish: Matias, Matti
 French: Mathias, Matthias, Matthis
 Gaelic: Maitias
 Georgian: Mate (მათე)
 German: Mathias, Matthias
 Hungarian: Mátyás
 Icelandic: Matthías
 Italian: Mattia
 Latin: Matthias
 Latvian: Matiass, Matejs, Matīss
 Lithuanian: Motiejus
 Norwegian: Mattias, Matthias, Mats
 Polish: Maciej
 Portuguese: Matias (current spelling), Mathias (archaic spelling)
 Romanian: Matei
 Russian: Матфий (do not confuse with Матфей (Матвей))
 Serbo-Croatian: Matija (Матија), Matej (Матеј), Mate (Мате)
 Slovak: Matej
 Slovenian: Matija, Matej, Matjaž
 Spanish: Matías
 Swedish: Mattias, Mathias, Mattis, Mats
 Welsh: Mathew, Matheus

See also

 
 Justice Matthias (disambiguation)
 Mathias (disambiguation)
 Matias
 Mattathias
 Mattias

English masculine given names
French masculine given names
German masculine given names
Dutch masculine given names
Scandinavian masculine given names
Norwegian masculine given names
Swedish masculine given names
Danish masculine given names
Finnish masculine given names
Icelandic masculine given names
Hebrew masculine given names
Given names of Greek language origin